The North Black Rock Range Wilderness is a U S Wilderness Area in Nevada under the Bureau of Land Management. It is located northeast of Soldier Meadows and south of the Summit Lake Indian Reservation.

See also 
Black Rock Desert-High Rock Canyon Emigrant Trails National Conservation Area

References

External links 
North Black Rock Range Wilderness - Wilderness Connect

Wilderness areas of Nevada
Protected areas of Humboldt County, Nevada
IUCN Category Ib
Bureau of Land Management areas in Nevada